The Rhaetian Railway ABe 4/16 is a class of metre gauge four-car electric multiple unit trains of the Rhaetian Railway (RhB), which is the main railway network in the Canton of Graubünden, Switzerland.

The class is so named under the Swiss locomotive and railcar classification system. According to this system, ABe 4/16 denotes an electric railcar train with first and second class compartments, and a total of 16 axles, four of which are drive axles. 

The ABe 4/16 trains for the Rhaetian Railway were scheduled to be delivered from late 2010. Entry into service was somewhat  later. It was intended that the trains would be used mainly on commuter trains on the railway's core network, which is electrified at 11 kV 16.7 Hz AC.

Each train is almost 75 metres long and is equipped with comfortable air-conditioned compartments for 24 first class and 156 second class passengers. One of the end cars of each train has four powered axles; the twelve axles under the other three cars are unpowered.

External links 

 Official Rhaetian Railway website
 Manufacturer's site Website of the manufacturer of the ABe 4/16
 Datasheet Comprehensive datasheet of the manufacturer (in German)

Stadler Rail multiple units
Multiple units of Switzerland

Rhaetian Railway multiple units